The 1927–28 Campeonato de Portugal was the 7th edition of the Portuguese football knockout tournament, organized by the Portuguese Football Federation (FPF). The 1927–28 Campeonato de Portugal began on the 4 March 1928. The final was played on the 30 June 1928 at the Campo de Palhavã.

Belenenses were the previous holders, having defeated Vitória de Setúbal 3–0 in the previous season's final. Carcavelinhos defeated Sporting CP, 3–1 in the final to win their first Campeonato de Portugal.

Semi-finals
Ties were played on the 24 June.

Final

References

Campeonato de Portugal (1922–1938)
Port
1927–28 in Portuguese football